The following is a discography of Extreme, a Boston-based hard rock/heavy metal band. Extreme has released five studio albums, two EPs (only in Japan), two compilations, and eighteen singles. This list does not include material performed by members or former members of Extreme that was recorded with DramaGods, Tribe of Judah, Mourning Widows, or Satellite Party.

Albums

Studio albums

Live albums

Compilation albums

Other appearances

Studio

Extended plays

Singles

References

Discographies of American artists